Cregeen is a surname of Manx origin. It is a contraction of O'Criocain, meaning Criocan's son.

Persons
David Cregeen, British sculptor
Graham Cregeen, Member of the House of Keys
Peter Cregeen (b. 1940), British television director, producer and executive
Archibald Cregeen, Manx lexicographer

References

Surnames
Manx-language surnames